Canada competed at the 1956 Winter Olympics in Cortina d'Ampezzo, Italy. Canada has competed at every Winter Olympic Games.

Medalists

Alpine skiing

Men

Women

Cross-country skiing

Men

Figure skating

Men

Women

Pairs

Ice hockey

Canada was represented by the Kitchener-Waterloo Dutchmen, which would later represent Canada at the 1960 Winter Olympics (silver medal).  The Dutchmen are the only self-contained club team to represent Canada at two different Olympics.

Group A
Top two teams advanced to Medal Round.

Canada 4-0 Germany (UTG)
Canada 23-0 Austria
Italy 1-3 Canada

Games for 1st-6th places

Canada 6-3 Czechoslovakia
USA 4-1 Canada
Canada 10-0 Germany (UTG)
Canada 6-2 Sweden
USSR 2-0 Canada

Leading scorers

Nordic combined 

Events:
 normal hill ski jumping (Three jumps, best two counted and shown here.)
 15 km cross-country skiing

Ski jumping

Speed skating

Men

References

 Olympic Winter Games 1956, full results by sports-reference.com

Nations at the 1956 Winter Olympics
1956
Winter Olympics